Coming Up Roses is a 1986 Welsh language comedy film. It was directed by Stephen Bayly and starred Dafydd Hywel, Gillian Elisa and Mari Emlyn. The film was screened in the Un Certain Regard section at the 1986 Cannes Film Festival.

The film centres on the closure of the last small town cinema in South Wales and the community's efforts to pull together to save the cinema.

Cast
 Dafydd Hywel as Trevor
 Iola Gregory as Mona
 Gillian Elisa as Sian
 Mari Emlyn as June
 Ifan Huw Dafydd as Dave
 Rowan Griffiths as Pete
 Olive Michael as Gwen
 Bill Paterson as Mr. Valentine
 W. J. Phillips as Eli Davies
 Clyde Pollitt as Councillor
 Mike Lewis as Trevor's Son

References

External links
 

1986 films
1986 comedy-drama films
British comedy-drama films
Films directed by Stephen Bayly
Films set in a movie theatre
Films set in Wales
Welsh films
Welsh-language films
1986 comedy films
1986 drama films
1980s British films